Difethialone is an anticoagulant used as a rodenticide.  It is considered a second generation agent.

In May 2008, the EPA added restrictions on the sale of difethialone in consumer-use rodenticide products and also for exterior use by commercial applicators.

References

Rodenticides
Bromoarenes
Thiochromanes
Tetralins
Biphenyls
Anticoagulant rodenticides